My Friend from India is a 1927 silent film comedy directed by E. Mason Hopper and starring Franklin Pangborn and Elinor Fair. It was produced by DeMille Pictures and distributed by Pathé Exchange.

A previous film of this story was made in 1914 by the Edison Company.

Prints survive at the Library of Congress and UCLA Film & TV Archive.

Cast
Franklin Pangborn - William/Tommy Valentine
Elinor Fair - Bernice/Barbara
Ben Hendricks Jr. - Charles/Charlie
Ethel Wales - Arabella Mott/Bedelia Smith
Jeanette Loff - Marion/Ruth Brooks
Tom Ricketts - Judge Elmer Elderberry Egbert Belmore
Louis Natheaux - T. Austin Webb
Tom Dugan - Kasha Murti/ Swami/ Bogus Hindu Prince
George Ovey - Valet to Hindu Prince
Edgar Norton - Jennings, a Butler

References

External links

lantern slide(archived)

1927 films
American silent feature films
American black-and-white films
Films directed by E. Mason Hopper
Pathé Exchange films
Silent American comedy films
1927 comedy films
1920s American films